Witbank Spurs are a South African football (soccer) club based in Witbank, Mpumalanga that competes in the Premier Soccer League's National First Division.

History
The club was formed in 1962 as Eastern Rangers Football Club. In 1975, the club was renamed Ferrometals United F.C. This was due to a sponsorship deal from Ferrometals. The club continued under the name until 2000, when Ferrometals stopped its sponsorship of the club. The club then took the name Witbank Spurs F.C. The club was again renamed in 2001, to Peoples Bank Spurs, due to a sponsorship agreement with People Bank. In 2019 the club was renamed the Anu Spurs.

Witbank Spurs spent most of its life in the Mpumalanga provincial league Following the 2004–05 season, the club was promoted to the National First Division.

References

External links
Witbank Spurs Official Website
Premier Soccer League
NFD Club Info
Club logo

 
Association football clubs established in 2000
National First Division clubs
Soccer clubs in Mpumalanga
2000 establishments in South Africa